Alworth may refer to:

Alworth, Illinois, unincorporated community in the United States
Lance Alworth (born 1940), American former football player

See also
Alworths, former UK retail store chain
Allworth (disambiguation)
Aldworth (disambiguation)